This is a list of cities in Mauritania by population. All settlements with a population over 10,000 are listed.

Other settlements 
 Akreijit (أكريجيت)
 Bir Moghrein (بير مغرين)
 Chinguetti (شنقيط)
 Choum (شوم)
 F'dérik (افديرك)
 Ouadane (وادان)
 Tichit (تيشيت)

See also
List of metropolitan areas in Africa
List of largest cities in the Arab world

References

 
Mauritania, List of cities in
Mauritania
Cities